Léon Pierre Alphonse Dens (17 October 1869 – 16 November 1940) was a Belgian politician and shipowner. A member of the Liberal Party, he was killed during the Blitz.

Family
He was son of Charles Dens. He married Louise Lejeune, who predeceased him.

Political career
 1925–1940: senator for the district Antwerp
 1931–1932: minister of defense
 1935–1936: President of the Liberal Party

Honours
This list is incomplete
Grand Officer Order of Leopold (Belgium)
Grand Cordon Order of Skanderbeg (Albania)
Commander of the Order of the British Empire (United Kingdom)

Death
Following the German invasion of Belgium in the Second World War he became an exile in England and was killed during an air raid when the Savoy Hotel in London, was bombed in November 1940.

References

Sources
 Presidents of the Belgian liberal party

1869 births
1940 deaths

Politicians from Antwerp
Belgian Ministers of Defence
Belgian people in the United Kingdom during World War II
Belgian civilians killed in World War II
Deaths by airstrike during World War II